René Suetovius (born 3 June 1964) is a German former boxer. He competed in the men's light heavyweight event at the 1988 Summer Olympics.

References

External links
 

1964 births
Living people
Light-heavyweight boxers
German male boxers
Olympic boxers of East Germany
Boxers at the 1988 Summer Olympics
People from Zittau
Sportspeople from Saxony